Eugène Lefebvre (9 November 1868, El Biar - 2 July 1921) was a French politician. He represented the Radical Party in the Chamber of Deputies from 1919 to 1921.

References

1868 births
1921 deaths
People from El Biar
People of French Algeria
Pieds-Noirs
Radical Party (France) politicians
Members of the 12th Chamber of Deputies of the French Third Republic